George Mary Searle (June 27, 1839 – July 7, 1918) was an American astronomer and Catholic priest.

Biography

He discovered the asteroid 55 Pandora in 1858. He also discovered six galaxies. In later life he became a member of the Paulist order and taught at The Catholic University of America.

In 1905, Searle published his idea for a possible reform of the Gregorian Calendar. The plan was to have every new year beginning on Sunday, in order to achieve a perennial calendar. In common years the new calendar would have 52 weeks exactly, or 364 days, with February shortened to 27 days. In leap years, there would be 53 weeks, or 371 days. The extra week would be added as a holiday week, between April and May. Leap years would occur every fifth year, except for years divisible by 50, and except for one other 5th year in 400. The result would be a calendar with 20,871 weeks in 400 years, equal to the Gregorian Calendar.

In 1916, he wrote a book denouncing the Christian Science of Mary Baker Eddy.

Publications

 Plain Facts for Fair Minds: An Appeal to Candor and Common Sense (1900)
 Talks for the Times: Indifferentism, Revelation, the Catholic Church and Science, the Friend of True Progress, the Purpose of Life (1912)
 Why the Catholic Church Cannot Accept Socialism (1913)
 The Truth About Christian Science (1916)

See also 
 List of Roman Catholic scientist-clerics
 Leap week calendar

References 
 

 The Catholic Encyclopedia and Its Makers (1917), p. 157; archive.org.
 George M. Searle, C.S.P., "A Possible Calendar," The Catholic World, A Monthly Magazine of General Literature and Science (Nov. 1 1905), p. 239.

External links 
 A Possible Calendar
 

1839 births
1918 deaths
American astronomers
American Roman Catholic priests
Catholic University of America faculty
Critics of Christian Science

Discoverers of asteroids
Catholic clergy scientists
Recipients of the Lalande Prize